Rongcheng is a county-level city of the prefecture-level city of Weihai, at the eastern extremity of Shandong Province, China, looking out to the Yellow Sea in all directions but the west.

History
According to historical records, the First Emperor of the Qin dynasty had visited Rongcheng twice, building bridges and temples. In 1735, during the Qing dynasty, the Yongzheng Emperor gave Rongcheng its present name.

Notable Events

In June 2011, a mutiny and mass murder broke out on Lurongyu 2682, a fishing trawler registered in Rongcheng. After a month-long killings in the West Pacific, 11 of the 33 crew returned. In July 2013, the Intermediate Court of Wendeng, adjacent to Rongcheng, convicted the 11 men with murder.

Administration

There are 10 subdistricts and 12 towns under Rongcheng's administration.

Subdistricts

Towns

Transport
 China National Highway 309
 Shandong Provincial Highway 301
 Shandong Provincial Highway 908
Rongcheng railway station

Climate

References

External links
 Rongcheng Municipal Government website

Cities in Shandong
Weihai
County-level divisions of Shandong